Maria Lourdes "Nancy" Sombillo Binay-Angeles (born May 12, 1973) is a Filipina politician serving as a Senator since 2013. She is the daughter of former Vice President Jejomar Binay. Without any prior experience in government, Binay placed a bid for a seat in the Senate in the 2013 elections and won, placing fifth overall. After being elected, Binay chaired both the Cultural Communities and the Tourism committees of the Senate in the 17th Congress. Binay was re-elected in the 2019 elections for a second consecutive term.

Education
Binay pursued her elementary and secondary education at St. Scholastica's College, Manila. She entered the University of the Philippines Diliman in June 1991, where she initially studied economics before earning a Bachelor of Science in Tourism degree, graduating in 1997.

Political career
Nancy Binay is the eldest daughter of the former vice president of the Philippines, Jejomar C. Binay and Dr. Elenita Binay. Nancy Binay is also the older sister of Abigail Binay, the current mayor of Makati, and Jejomar Binay, Jr., former mayor of Makati.

Between 1998 and 2001, Binay performed administrative duties as a personal assistant to her mother, liaising between the Mayor's office and other governmental departments and offices as well as with the private sector. From 2010 she functioned as personal assistant to her father, who was the vice president at the time. In this role, she liaised between the Office of the Vice President and the Housing and Urban Development Coordinating Council, as well as with other local government offices. In 2012, she was listed as one of the top 20 potential senatorial candidates for the UNA.

Senate
On October 5, 2012 Binay  replaced Joey de Venecia to run for senator in the 2013 elections. De Venecia had earlier withdrawn his candidacy from the UNA's ticket. Binay is a member of the same party, which was also her father's coalition, and she became the party's Deputy Secretary General. Leading up to her selection as a senatorial candidate for the alliance, Binay consistently ranked in the top 12 in the Pulse Asia November 2012 survey, which ranked the popularity of potential candidates.

Binay is a child advocate. The charitable foundations with which she has been involved are geared towards caring for abandoned children and providing educational opportunities for the less fortunate. Her main platform for the 2013 Senate elections was for improving the outlook for pregnant women, particularly those of poor economic status, as a means of improving infant mortality and health.

Binay did not attend any of the public debates for the senatorial candidates, noted pundit Prospero De Vera, "preferring to engage in debate when she's already in the Senate."

She was selected as the 12th senatorial nominee for the United Nationalist Alliance (UNA) for the 2013 senatorial race. She won and became a senator in the 16th Congress.

16th Congress

Binay won in the 2013 senatorial elections, placing 5th place. She has been criticized for her silence on controversial issues regarding her father from 2013 to 2016, when her father Jejomar Binay, was the vice president of the Philippines, and her opposition to the anti-political dynasty bill as she is part of a political dynasty in Makati, where her father, mother, and brother have become mayors. During the 16th Congress, she filed 119 bills and 151 resolutions advocating the interests of women and children, the youth, the elderly, and housing for the poor. Among her bills that passed into law were An Act Repealing the Crime of Premature Marriage under Article 251 of the Revised Penal Code (R.A. 10655), Sugarcane Industry Development Act of 2015 (R.A. 10659), and An Act Expanding the Benefits and Privileges of Persons with Disability (R.A. 10754). She also sponsored the passage of the Centenarians Act of 2016 (R.A. 10868). She aided in the presidential bid of her father during the 2016 Philippine presidential race. Her father, who initially placed 1st, eventually lost and placed 4th on election day. Binay has been cyber-bullied by numerous Filipino social media comedic accounts due to her fashion sense during the annual SONA and her natural Filipino skin color, to a point that she has been compared with the Black Nazarene. She retaliated stating, 'I was born this way. We should just accept who we are'.

17th Congress

In the 17th Congress, Binay supported the Anti-discrimination bill based on SOGIE which protected the rights of Filipino LGBT citizens, the Mental Health Act which establishes a nationwide mental health campaign and inputting of mental health education in the Filipino educational system, the Department of Culture bill which aims to establish a holistic culture department, and the Free Higher Education Law which provides free education in all public colleges and universities in the Philippines. She was co-sponsor of the Expanded Maternity Leave Law of 2017 (SB No. 1305) which grants 120-day maternity leave to female workers regardless of civil status, and The Filipino Sign Language Act (SB No. 1455), which declares the Filipino Sign Language as the national sign language of the Filipino deaf and the official sign language of the government in all transactions with the deaf. She also advocated for the Expanded NIPAS Act of 2017 (SB No. 1444) which enlarged the cover of protected areas in the Philippines, the First 1000 Days of Life Bill (SB 1145), and the amendment to the Local Government Act providing for permanent positions to tourism officers (SB 1565). She was against the re-imposition of the death penalty, the 1,000 peso budget of the Commission on Human Rights, and amending of the 1987 Constitution via a constitutional assembly. Binay favors a constitutional convention over a constitutional assembly. During the Burial of Ferdinand Marcos controversy, Binay abstained. She has criticized the government for its deadly Philippine Drug War which has killed more than 14,000 Filipinos, government's Presidential Communications Operations Office and government-hired bloggers which have caused the surge in Filipino fake news, government's biased diplomacy with China, and the entrance of Chinese foreign ships in the Philippine Rise which was allowed by the President and his foreign affairs secretary. The House Speaker threatened senators who were not in favor of a constitutional assembly, nonetheless, Binay stood her ground and urged politicians to implement the Local Government Code effectively first before a constitutional change via constitutional convention can begin. In February, she urged government again to end contractualization, especially within government agencies. In March, Binay criticized the management of Boracay, and presidential palace for false alarming statements that caused public panic. She also supported the proposed anti-dynasty bill in the Senate, surprising many as she was against it during her first three years as senator. After the Quo warranto petition against Maria Lourdes Sereno that ousted the Chief Justice, Binay chose to not sign the resolution challenging Sereno's ouster, citing that she 'respect the separation of powers between the legislative and judiciary'. Binay backed the declaration of martial law in Mindanao in 2017 but left the Senate floor during the 2018 voting of the extension of martial law in the region, where majority voted in favor of extension. She was one of the senators who voted in favor of the Tax Reform for Acceleration and Inclusion Law (TRAIN Law).

Personal life
Nancy Binay is married to Jose Benjamin Angeles, a construction and real estate businessman with whom she has four children. They reside in Barangay San Antonio, Makati.

References

External links
 Senator Maria Lourdes Nancy Sombillo Binay – Senate of the Philippines

1973 births
Living people
Nancy
People from Makati
Politicians from Metro Manila
Senators of the 18th Congress of the Philippines
21st-century Filipino women politicians
21st-century Filipino politicians
Senators of the 17th Congress of the Philippines
Senators of the 16th Congress of the Philippines
United Nationalist Alliance politicians
University of the Philippines Diliman alumni
Women members of the Senate of the Philippines
Senators of the 19th Congress of the Philippines